The Florida State Seminoles football statistical leaders are individual statistical leaders of the Florida State Seminoles football program in various categories, including passing, rushing, receiving, total offense, defensive stats, and kicking. Within those areas, the lists identify single-game, single-season, and career leaders. The Seminoles represent Florida State University in the NCAA's Atlantic Coast Conference.

Florida State began competing in intercollegiate football in 1947. This relatively recent start date means that, unlike many other teams, the Seminoles do not divide statistics into a "modern" era and a "pre-modern" era in which complete statistics are unavailable. Thus, all of the lists below potentially include players from as far back as 1947.

These lists are dominated by more recent players for several reasons:
 Since 1947, seasons have increased from 10 games to 11 and then 12 games in length.
 The NCAA didn't allow freshmen to play varsity football until 1972 (with the exception of the World War II years), allowing players to have four-year careers.
 Bowl games only began counting toward single-season and career statistics in 2002. The Seminoles have played in a bowl game every year since the decision, giving players an extra game to accumulate statistics each year since 2002.
 Similarly, the Seminoles have played in the ACC Championship Game five times since it first occurred in 2005, giving players in those seasons an additional game to accumulate statistics.

These lists are updated through the end of the 2017 season.

Passing

Passing yards

Passing touchdowns

Rushing

Rushing yards

Rushing touchdowns

Receiving

Receptions

Receiving yards

Receiving touchdowns

Total offense

Total offense is the sum of passing and rushing statistics. It does not include receiving or returns.

Total offense yards

Touchdowns responsible for
"Touchdowns responsible for" is the official NCAA term for combined passing and rushing touchdowns.

Defense

Interceptions

Tackles

Sacks

Kicking

Field goals made

Field goal percentage

References

External links
Offensive Records
Defensive Records

Lists of college football statistical leaders by team